Najjar is an Arabic and Sephardic surname and profession meaning carpenter. Notable people with surnames Najjar, al-Najjar, or al-Najar include:

Ancient
Habib Al-Najjar (c. AD 5-40), or Saint Habib the Carpenter
Yousef Al-Najjar (c. 90 BC-AD 18), or Saint Joseph the Carpenter, Jesus's legal father
Ibn Al Najjar a hanbali scholar of Sunni Islam

Modern
Aida Najjar (1938–2020), Palestinian-Jordanian writer
Ammar Campa-Najjar (born 1989), American Democratic politician
Ahmad El Najjar, Egyptian economist
Ammar Al-Najar (born 1997), Saudi football player
Fadel Al-Najjar (born 1985), Jordanian professional basketball player
Ibrahim Najjar, Lebanese lawyer and politician
Humaid Al-Najar, Emirati footballer
John Najjar, executive stylist at Ford Motor Company and creator of the Ford Mustang
Mansor Al-Najar, Saudi football player
Marwan G. Najjar (1947–2023), Lebanese scriptwriter 
Mostafa Mohammad-Najjar (born 1956), Iranian politician
Moudi Najjar (born 2000), Australian football player
Muhammad Youssef al-Najjar (1930–1973), commonly known as Abu Youssef, Palestinian militant
Najwa Najjar (born 1965), Palestinian filmmaker
Redha al-Najar, Tunisian citizen who was held in US custody in the Bagram Theater Internment Facility
Ramsay G. Najjar (1952–2020), Lebanese businessman
Rouzan al-Najjar, Palestinian nurse assisting injured Palestinians accidentally hit by ricochet by Israeli sniper on June 1, 2018
 Victor Assad Najjar (1914–2002), Lebanese-born American pediatrician and microbiologist, known for the Crigler–Najjar syndrome

Fictional characters
Noore Najjar, a fictional character from 2014 Ubisoft video game Far Cry 4

See also

Naggar

Arabic-language surnames